Carlos Rinaldi (February 5, 1915 – 1995 in Buenos Aires) was an Argentine film director, film editor and screenwriter.

Rinaldi began as a film editor in 1937 but in 1949 he became a film director and directed some 30 pictures working on films such as Besos perdidos. As a director he directed films such as Andrea and Adiós, Alejandra, Andrea in 1973.

He was involved in over 60 films in the Cinema of Argentina between 1937 and 1978.

Filmography

As director

 La cuna vacía (1949)
 Fantasmas asustados (1951)
 El baldío (1952)
 La patrulla chiflada (1952)
 Vigilantes y ladrones (1952)
 Del otro lado del puente (1953)
 Un hombre cualquiera (1954)
 Casada y señorita (1954)
 Pobre pero honrado (1955)
 El millonario (1955)
 África ríe (1956)
 Todo sea para bien (1957)
 Las apariencias engañan (1958)
 Salitre (1959)
  Yo quiero vivir contigo (1960)
 Male and Female Since Adam and Eve (1961)
 El castillo de los monstruos (1964)
 El desastrólogo (1964)
 Viaje de una noche de verano (1965)
 Bicho raro (1965)
 Pimienta (1966)
 ¡Al diablo con este cura! (1967)
 El Derecho a la felicidad (1968)
 Maternidad sin hombres (1968)
 Pimienta y pimentón (1970)
 Balada para un mochilero (1971)
 Mi amigo Luis (1972)
 Adiós Alejandra (1973)
 Andrea (1973)
 No apto para menores (1979)
 Alerta en azul  (1980)
 El diablo metió la pata (1980)

External links
 

1915 births
1995 deaths
Argentine film directors
Male screenwriters
Argentine film editors
People from Buenos Aires
20th-century Argentine screenwriters
20th-century Argentine male writers